Rocío Muñoz Morales (Madrid, June 10, 1988) is a Spanish actress, presenter, and model who has spent most of her career in Italy. She began her career as a dancer and went on to appear in film and in the theatre. In 2018 she returned to Spain to present the Spanish version of Dancing with the Stars.

Biography 
Born in Madrid in 1988, she began her dance studies at the age of six, specializing in ballroom dancing; she reached the highest category in this specialty at the age of twelve and became one of the Spanish elite in this dance discipline, combining it with her school studies. Her debut on television was as a teacher and dancer in the program ¡Mira quién baila!,  which was broadcast by TVE and later by Telecinco, under the name ¡Más que baile!.

She began to develop her international career as a dancer with Spanish singer Julio Iglesias, taking part in some of his world tours, such as Live, Julio Iglesias en concierto and 40 años. In 2010, she debuted as an actress in La pecera de Eva, produced by Isla Producciones and broadcast on Telecinco. That same year, she played the character of Samantha in the second season of the series Ángel o demonio, on Telecinco. In 2012 she stars in the comedy Todo es posible en el bajo, produced and directed by Jose Luis Moreno.

In her career as a model, she has collaborated with numerous fashion and advertising brands. In addition, she has also posed for magazines such as Elle, Vogue, Woman, Telva, Glamour, Vanity Fair, Grazia or Yo Donna; she has also been the image of brands such as Vodafone, Mercedes, L'Oréal, Nescafé, Media Markt, Hello Kitty, Disney, etc.

In 2012, she premiered her first work in international cinema, becoming a great success with critics and audiences with the film , directed by Paolo Genovese.  That same year, she presented the program Premier Casino, which she also presented the following year.

In 2014, she joined the third season of the hit Italian TV series A un paso del cielo, in which she would play Eva Fernandez for two more seasons until 2019.

In 2015, she presented the San Remo Music Festival alongside Carlo Conti, an event that definitely launched her career in Italy. In the same year, she appears as Anna Rossi Ribeiro in Tango Per La Libertà, a two-part Rai 1 miniseries. As well, she is in the American movie All Roads Lead to Rome, directed by Ella Lemhagen and stars Sarah Jessica Parker.

In 2017, she made her theatrical debut in the production Certe Notti, directed by Giuseppe Miale di Mauro.In the same year, she co-stars with Massimo Boldi in Neri Parenti's film Natale Da Chef. In November 2017, she returns to the stage with the social satire comedy Dì Che Ti Manda Picone, which will tour throughout Italy.In 2018, she made her film debut as one of the female protagonists in Tu Mi Nascondi Qualcosa.

In May 2018, she returned to her native country to present, alongside Roberto Leal, the first edition of Bailando con las estrellas on TVE, a format of great success worldwide (Dancing with the Stars).

Private life 
She maintains a sentimental relationship with Italian actor Raoul Bova, with whom on December 2, 2015 she had a daughter, Luna. On November 1, 2018, her second daughter, Alma, was born. Since 2017, Roco has been the face of the Chicco Di Felicità charity campaign, supported by the Chicco children's brand in favor of the defense of minors in need.

Rocío Muñoz Morales is Roman Catholic.

Filmography

Films

Television

Theater

References

External links 
 Rocío Muñoz Morales on IMDb

Spanish film actresses
Spanish television actresses
Living people
1988 births
Spanish Roman Catholics